George Henry Sheldon (June 3, 1947 – August 23, 2018) was an American attorney and politician who served as a member of the Florida House of Representatives, as the Secretary of the Florida Department of Children and Families, and as the Acting Assistant Secretary at the federal Administration for Children and Families within the Department of Health and Human Services. A member of the Democratic Party, he ran unsuccessfully for Attorney General of Florida in 2014.

Biography
George Sheldon was born in Wildwood, New Jersey on June 3, 1947. He was raised in Plant City, Florida. He received both his B.A. and J.D. from Florida State University.

Sheldon's political career began in 1969, when he was a legislative aide for state senator and future governor Reubin Askew. Sheldon was a state representative in the Tampa area from 1974 to 1982, before running against Congressman Michael Bilirakis. Sheldon would serve in private practice until 1999, when he became Deputy Attorney General for Central Florida under Attorney General Bob Butterworth. In 2003, he assumed the post of Associate Dean at St Thomas University School of Law; and in 2008, Sheldon became the Secretary of the Florida Department of Children and Families under governor Charlie Crist. While at Florida DCF, Sheldon played a key role in relief efforts for refugees from Haiti's 2010 earthquake. He was also recognized by a national child welfare coalition as leading the "largest transformation of an American child welfare system in recent decades, turning Florida from the national example of failure into, relatively speaking, a leader in doing child welfare right." Sheldon would later become the Acting Assistant Secretary for the federal Administration for Children and Families in the United States Department of Health and Human Services from 2011 to 2013.

Sheldon was the Democratic nominee for Attorney General of Florida in the 2014 election, but lost to incumbent Republican Pam Bondi.

Sheldon died from complications of a fall in Miami, Florida, on August 23, 2018, at the age of 71.

References 

|-

1947 births
2018 deaths
People from Plant City, Florida
People from Wildwood, New Jersey
Florida State University alumni
St. Thomas University (Florida) faculty
Florida lawyers
Democratic Party members of the Florida House of Representatives
State cabinet secretaries of Florida
United States Department of Health and Human Services officials
Obama administration personnel
Accidental deaths in Florida
Deaths from falls